= Tangshan hot springs =

There are two different Tang Shan Hot Springs in China. One is 30 km North of Beijing. The other is near Nanjing.

Beijing's Tang Shan Hot Springs is situated around thirty kilometers north of Beijing. There are two Tang Shan hot springs situated between the Tang Shan mountains and they have become an increasingly popular tourist attraction. The two springs are Boiling Spring (Feiquan), and Warm Spring (Wenquan). The two springs are only three meters apart but their water temperatures vary greatly. The spring waters are rich in minerals thought useful in the treatment of skin diseases.

Nanjing's "Tang Shan Hot Springs" are referenced in the chinatravel.net link below.
